Belisama (Gaulish Belesama; epigraphically ) is a Celtic goddess. She was identified by Roman commentators with Minerva by interpretatio romana.

Name 
The Gaulish theonym Belesama has been traditionally interpreted as meaning 'the very bright', stemming from the Indo-European root *bʰelH- ('white, shining'; cf. Lith. báltas 'white', Greek φαλόσ phalós 'white', Arm. bal 'pallor', goth. bala 'grey') attached to the superlative suffix *-isamā. As for Belenos, however, this theory has come under increasing criticism in contemporary scholarship.

Xavier Delamarre notes that the proposed cognates stemming from *bʰelH- do not seem to connote 'shining', but rather 'white, grey, pale', and proposes to derive the name from the Gaulish root belo- ('strong, powerful'), rendering Belesama as 'the very strong' (cf. Sanskrit baliṣṭhaḥ 'the strongest'). Alternatively, Peter Schrijver has conjectured a connection with the stem for 'henbane', *beles-, attached to an unknown suffix -ma, by comparing the name with the Gaulish theonym Belisa-maros. Acccording to him, this is "formally attractive and semantically possible (if *Belesama = Lat. Minerva medica) but not supported by direct evidence".

The toponyms Beleymas, Bellême, Balesmes, Blesmes, Blismes, and Velesmes are based on the theonym. The name also appears in various river names of Gauls and Britain, including Belisama (River Ribble) and Le Blima (Tarn). The Galatian personal name Blesamius, from an earlier *Belesamios, may also be added to the comparison.

Attestations

A Gaulish inscription found at Vaison-la-Romaine in Provence (RIG G-172) shows that a nemeton was dedicated to her:
 СΕΓΟΜΑΡΟС/ ΟΥΙΛΛΟΝΕΟС/ ΤΟΟΥΤΙΟΥС/ ΝΑΜΑΥСΑΤΙС/ ΕΙѠΡΟΥ ΒΗΛΗ/СΑΜΙ СΟСΙΝ/ ΝΕΜΗΤΟΝ
 Segomaros Ouilloneos tooutious Namausatis eiōrou Bēlēsami sosin nemēton
 "Segomarus Uilloneos, citizen [toutius] of Namausus, dedicated this sanctuary to Belesama"
The identification with Minerva in Gallo-Roman religion is established in a  Latin inscription from Saint-Lizier (anciently Consoranni),  Ariège department (CIL XIII, 8):
Minervae / Belisamae / sacrum / Q(uintus) Valerius / Montan[us] / [e]x v[oto?]

The presence of the goddess in Ancient Britain is more difficult to establish. Based on Ptolemy's reference to a "Belisama estuary" (Βελισαμα), River Ribble in England seems to have been known by the name Belisama in Roman times.

Theories 
The attestation of the theonym as a river name may indicate that she was a lake- and river-goddess. Belisama has also been speculatively claimed as companion of Belenos, whose name seems to contain the same root.

See also
 178 Belisana, asteroid named after the goddess

References

Bibliography

External links

 Belisama: a Gaulish and Brythonic goddess (Summer Bright)

Gaulish goddesses
Sea and river goddesses
Minerva